The Mansion House (also known as The Mansion) is the official summer palace of the President of the Philippines. The mansion is located in the summer capital of the country, Baguio, situated around  asl in the Cordillera Central Range of northern Luzon.

History

The Mansion House was built in 1908 to serve as the official summer residence of American governors-general at the insistence of Governor-General William Cameron Forbes. The name is derived from the summer cottage in New England of Governor Forbes whose administration the original Mansion House was built under. Architect William E. Parsons, based on preliminary plans by architect Daniel H. Burnham, the planner of the city of Baguio, designed the mountain retreat following the tenets of the City Beautiful Movement. In 1910, the meeting of the Second Philippine Legislature was held at the Mansion House for three weeks.

With the inauguration of the Philippine Commonwealth, the Mansion along with Malacañan Palace was turned over to the Philippine president. The high commissioner to the Philippines, successor to the governor-general as the highest American official in the Philippines and representative of the United States government, then built the American Residence, completed in 1940.

The house was badly damaged during the Second World War and was rebuilt in 1947. Since then, it has served as the holiday home and working office for each President during visits to Baguio.

The Mansion House was also used as the venue of important events, such as the second session of the United Nations Economic Commission for Asia and the Far East (ECAFE) in 1947, the second session of the Food and Agriculture Organization in 1948, and the first meeting of the Southeast Asian Union (SEAU), more commonly known as the Baguio Conference of 1950, which was conceived and convened by President Elpidio Quirino. More recently, the Mansion House has been the site of a number of international conferences.

On January 21, 1994, communist rebel Conrado Balweg and his followers who had been using the mansion's guest house as their headquarters since 1986 were ejected from it by policemen without violence.

Description
The Mansion consists of an elegantly designed Spanish Colonial Revival main building and a guesthouse. The elaborate main gate, made of ornate ironwork, was once thought to be a replica of a main gate of Buckingham Palace in London, but this is false. The front gate is still one of the most photographed sections of the complex. The public may visit the inside of the Mansion House, which contains a museum featuring presidential memorabilia.

Across the road from the Mansion House is Wright Park, a quiet promenade with a long reflecting pool lined with pine trees. A long stairway leads visitors to the back, where ponies for children are available for hire. Dotted all around the nearby hills are private holiday homes and small inns.

Gallery

See also
Malacañang Palace
Malacañang sa Sugbo
Malacañang of the North
Malacañang of the South

References

External links

 Presidential Museum and Library: Mansion House

Official residences in the Philippines
Buildings and structures completed in 1908
Buildings and structures in Baguio
Tourist attractions in Baguio
1908 establishments in the Philippines
Presidential residences in the Philippines
20th-century architecture in the Philippines